A. K. M. Fazle Hussain (born 20 January 1943, in Bangladesh) is a professor of mechanical engineering at Texas Tech University.

Education
Hussain graduated with a BS in mechanical engineering from Bangladesh University of Engineering and Technology in 1963. He went on to attend Stanford University, where he studied under William Craig Reynolds, and received his MS and PhD in mechanical engineering in 1966 and 1969.

Afterwards, Hussain was a post-doctoral fellow at the Johns Hopkins University with Leslie S. G. Kovasznay and Stanley Corrsin.

Career 
Hussain was a professor of mechanical engineering at University of Houston from 1976 to 2013. More recently, he was also a professor in the Earth & atmospheric science and physics departments from 2007 to 2013. At UH, he held the Cullen Professorship in mechanical engineering.

In 2001, Hussain was inducted into the National Academy of Engineering for "fundamental experiments and concepts concerning important structures in turbulence, vortex dynamics, and acoustics, and for new turbulence measurement techniques." He is also a member of the advisory board at Shahjalal University of Science and Technology.

Honors and awards
 Freeman Scholar Award of ASME in 1984
 Fluids Engineering Award of ASME in 2000
 Fluid Dynamics Award of AIAA in 2002

Books
Nonlinear Dynamics of Structures, World Scientific, 1991

Book chapters
 "Mechanics of Pulsatile Flows of Relevance to Cardiovascular System," in Cardiovascular Flow Dynamics and Measurements, (Eds. N.H.C. Hwang and N. Norman), University Park Press, Baltimore, pp. 541–632, 1976.
 "New Aspects of Vortex Dynamics Relevant to Coherent Structures in Turbulent Flows," in Eddy Structure Identification (Ed. J.P. Bonnet) Springer, pp. 61–143. 1996.
 "Genesis and Dynamics of Coherent Structures in Near-wall Turbulence: A New Look," in Self-Sustaining Mechanisms of Wall Turbulence  (Ed. R. L. Panton) Computational Mechanics Publications, Southampton, pp. 385, (1997).

References

External links
 https://web.archive.org/web/20110927030855/http://www.egr.uh.edu/me/faculty/hussain/

Living people
Fluid dynamicists
21st-century American physicists
American people of Bangladeshi descent
American mechanical engineers
Bangladeshi mechanical engineers
Stanford University alumni
Fellows of Bangladesh Academy of Sciences
Fellows of the American Society of Mechanical Engineers
Fellows of the American Institute of Aeronautics and Astronautics
Fellows of the American Physical Society
Bangladeshi scientists
Bengali scientists
Bangladeshi physicists
1943 births
Members of the United States National Academy of Engineering
Bangladesh University of Engineering and Technology alumni